Clementson is a surname. Notable people with the surname include:

 George Clementson (1842-1920), English American attorney and judge
 George B. Clementson (1871-1949), American attorney and author
 William Clementson (1884-1982), Australian politician

Other uses
 Clementson, Minnesota, an unincorporated community

See also
 Clemenson (surname)

Patronymic surnames
Surnames from given names